MS Rhapsody, is an Italian cruiseferry operated by Grandi Navi Veloci. She was built at Chantiers de l'Atlantique in Saint-Nazaire, France for the French ferry operator SNCM as Napoleon Bonaparte. In 1996, she was put on the Marseille–Corsica route, replacing the old ferry Napoleon which was moved to the Marseille–Algeria–Tunisia route. On October 27, 2012, the ship broke its moorings in the port of Marseille due to strong winds, violently struck the dock, and sunk in the harbour. Due to its financial difficulties, SNCM was unable to repair the ferry, and sold it to the Italian shipowner MSC in 2014. Refloated, the ship was renamed Rhapsody and transferred to Grandi Navi Veloci to sail first between Italy and Albania, and then from 2017 on the Genoa-Porto Torres route.

See also
Largest ferries of Europe

References

External links
 
 Rhapsody on Grandi Navi Veloci official website

Cruiseferries
Ferries of France
Ferries of Italy
Ships built by Chantiers de l'Atlantique
1995 ships